Viento A Favor is the 12th studio album recorded by Mexican performer Alejandro Fernández. It was released by Sony BMG Norte on June 26, 2007 (see 2007 in music).

Album information
The album was produced by Mexican singer-songwriter Áureo Baqueiro and the singer works again with the composers: Gian Marco, Reyli Barba and Leonel García. And this time, he invites Fonseca and the other half of Sin Bandera, and Noel Schajris. The release date was set on June 26, 2007. For the press conference to introduce the album to the media, the singer gathered all the people involved in Tequila, Jalisco, to talk about the tracks and the production .

Recording
The album was recorded in Buenos Aires, Argentina, Los Angeles, California, Mexico City, Mexico and Miami, Florida. Alejandro Fernández chose the 11 tracks (since "Amor Gitano" was previously recorded with Beyoncé), from 500 songs. Making the final cut the compositions from Gian Marco, Tres De Copas, Reyli Barba, Fonseca, Leonel García and Noel Schajris (from the Mexican group Sin Bandera).

Singles released
The video for the first single ("Te Voy A Perder") was shot in Mexico City and Tampico, and directed by Simon Brand. On August 27, 2007, the video for the second single ("No Se Me Hace Facil") was shot in Los Angeles, California and directed by Pablo Croce .

Track listing

Chart performance
The album debuted at No. 77 on the Billboard 200 chart, No. 2 on the Billboard Top Latin Albums chart, and No. 1 on the Billboard Latin Pop Albums survey  on the July 14, 2007, issue. As of July 11, 2007, the album has sold 16,295 copies in the US.

Album

Singles

Sales and certifications

References

2007 albums
Alejandro Fernández albums
Spanish-language albums
Sony BMG Norte albums